Jack Hatton (September 20, 1995 – September 24, 2019) was an American judoka representing the United States. He was known as "Judo Jack".   Hatton was a member of the US National Team.  Hatton competed in the 2018 and 2017 Senior World Championships in Judo.  He competed in the 81 kg division. Hatton was attempting to make the 2020 Olympic Team prior to its cancellation. He was coached by Jimmy Pedro.  

On September 24, 2019, Hatton was found dead at his home in Wakefield, Massachusetts, having died by suicide. He left no suicide note. He was 24 years old.

References

External links
 

1995 births
2019 deaths
American male judoka
Place of birth missing
Place of death missing
2019 suicides
Suicides in Massachusetts
21st-century American people